El Parián is a historic structure and tourist attraction in Tlaquepaque, in the Mexican state of Jalisco.

References

Tlaquepaque
Tourist attractions in Jalisco